Pietro Luccari (died 23 November 1679) was a Roman Catholic prelate who served as Bishop of Ston (1664–1679).

Biography
On 23 Jun 1664, Pietro Luccari was appointed by Pope Alexander VII as Bishop of Ston. He served as Bishop of Ston until his death on 23 Nov 1679.

References 

1679 deaths
17th-century Roman Catholic bishops in Croatia
Bishops appointed by Pope Alexander VII